Öcalan is a Turkish surname. Notable people with the surname include:

Abdullah Öcalan (born 1949), Kurdish militant leader, one of the founding members of militant organization Kurdistan Workers' Party (PKK)
Dilek Öcalan (born 1987), Turkish politician, niece of Abdullah Öcalan
Ömer Öcalan (born 1987), Turkish politician, nephew of Abdullah Öcalan
Osman Öcalan (born 1958), Kurdish militant leader, a former leading member of the PKK and younger brother of Abdullah Öcalan

Turkish-language surnames